Prabhudayal Vidyarthi (1925 –1977), also known as,  Prabhu Dayal Vidyarthi, was an Indian Freedom Fighter, Indian independence activist, 
Gandhian, Writer, Social Worker and politician. He heard Thakkar Bapa's public address, spreading Mahatma Gandhi's quest for "FREE INDIA", left home in search of Azaadi, aged barely 9/10 years, and became a close aide of Mahatma Gandhi. He followed Thakkar Bapa from Uska, in siddharthnagar district, Uttar Pradesh to Sevagram to meet Mahatma Gandhi and fight for India achieve Freedom from the British. Gandhiji,  was perplexed to see such a young boy wanting to participate in “Indian Freedom Struggle” and allowed him to stay at 'Segaon', which later come to be known as Sevagram. He is listed as the youngest member of Wardha Aahram. Gandhi also personally taught him.

Freedom Struggle

Prabhudayal was imprisoned several times for his involvement in the Freedom Struggle. He actively participated in Quit India Movement in 1942. He was one of the first Freedom Fighters to be issued an arrest warrant by the British. He went underground and travelled widely across India, which is detailed in "Apni Baat", an account of his travels and hideouts. British had put and award of ₹5000 for his arrest  He was eventually asked to surrender by Gandhi and was finally arrested at Sevagram Wardha,on 9 November 1944 by the British, for  “actively supporting and helping the underground organisation of the mass movement of August 8, 1942”, at the outset of Quit India Movement. He was immediately taken to Red Fort from Nagpur, put in isolation cell, questioned and tortured because of his active participation in Quit India Movement and close association with Gandhi and prominent leaders such as Subhas Chandra Bose.

Prabhudayal's condition at his release from jail was a telling story of what went behind bars and the same was published in the english daily, The Hindustan Times on 4 November 1945. This was taken up with British Govt by Gandhiji on his release when he came back to Sevagram in dilapidated condition, detailed in Gandhi's Correspondence with the British, LETTER TO SIR EVAN M. JENKINS, Collected Works of Mahatma Gandhi, Vol 88, Page 371 letter no 686 

British vehemently denied the fact that he was "Tortured" at Delhi Red Fort after his arrest. However, they categorically admitted that torture methods, as described by Prabhudayal were indeed correct and used at Lahore and Red Fort. "'Third degree methods' of physical/mental torture were deployed and continued to be used at Lahore and were certainly used at Delhi. For Delhi it also included some members of INA which has attempted to invade India under Subhas Chandra Bose. A New Statesman letter in july 1945 accused the British of placing sadists above the law, as had Germany, and that Indian prison camps witnessed physical torture that bore comparison with Nazi concentration camps at Buchenwald and Belson". Gandhiji had taken up cases of Prabhudayal Vidyarthi, Sheel Bhadra Yajee of the All India Forward Bloc, an active member of INA and Ram Manohar Lohia with British Authorities and all claims/cases were refuted on "Point of Fact". Prabhudayal Vidyarthi never fully recovered from the torture he underwent at Red Fort. He died, aged 52, on 7 September 1977, at Lucknow, Uttar Pradesh.

In Prabhudayal's case, British relied more on testimony of Devdas, rather than Prabhudayal's physical state on his release from jail and the narration of "exact torture methods" applied to Gandhi, which were found to be true, to close the case, even though Devdas was never arrested with Prabhudayal or ever confined in Red Fort. The cases of Prabhudayal Vidyarthi and Sheel Bhadra Yajee are discussed in detail in book "South Asian Governmentalities", page 125 onwards, edited by Stephen Legg, Deana Heath  
  and Colonial and Nationalist Truth Regimes by Stephen Legg which must be read with Mahatma Gandhi's letter exposing torture of Indian Freedom Fighters under British Rule A postcard was issued by Sevagram Ashram to honour his arrest. He wrote his first book on Gandhi in jail term during Quit India Movement

Work

Prabhudayal returned to his village in Basti, UP in 1945 and started working with local Freedom Fighters, Local Leaders and villagers at Gandhi’s behest. In rural India, “Jamindari” was still prevalent. He tried to convince local zamindars (landlords) and help the farmers get their land back. Many attempts to kill him were made as this did not go down well with zamindars. In 1951-52, Jawaharlal Nehru asked him to contest in the first Indian General Elections.

He was the youngest member of Sevagram and also the youngest person ever elected to the Legislative Assembly of Uttar Pradesh in the first Indian General  Election. He was always elected opposite Jansangh UP President Madhav Prasad Tripathi. As a Member of Assembly he had changed the local agrarian Eco-system and Economy by setting up a wide canal system for irrigation and enabling other progressive measures. He is widely known as "Purvanchal ke Gandhi" as he was the only person from Purvanchal (Eastern UP), to have lived with Gandhi and returned only after India was on the verge of attaining freedom, as per his resolve for return and worked relentlessly for their progress.

Vidyarthi wrote many articles and books on Gandhi and other leaders, the last being Devdoot Gandhi. His work was mainly published by The Pustak Bhandar. His articles on general topics would regularly appear in The Hindu, Harijan, Balsakha, and other publications. His book "Gandhi Amrit Vani" is widely read and freely available online on different portals.

He also did translation work for C. F. Andrews. His work can be found in CIET archives and the National Library, New Delhi. and Deenbandhu ko Shraddhajaliyan (दीनबन्धु को श्रद्धांजलियाँ)

His work is available at Gandhi Heritage Portal archives.

"Banganga Barrage" and "Banganga Canal Major Irrigation Project" (1953–56) were his initial contribution to help the farmers in the area. "Banganga Canal Major Irrigation Project" was completed in three years. A 45 km canal was constructed to irrigate 23,000 acres of land, in conjunction with other extensive public work campaign resulting in construction of barrage and roads to connect villages etc. immediately after Independence. "Banganga Barrage" is a serene place and is known in his name as a tribute to him.

Recognition

A postcard with his photo was issued by Sevagram immediately after his surrender/arrest in connection with "Quit India Movement".

Van Ganga Barage on Van Ganga River is named after Freedom Fighter Prabhudayal Vidyarthi 

The bridge on Farenda Naugarh-Barhni Shravasti Road, Siddharth Nagar, Uttar Pradesh, is named "Prabhu Dayal Vidyarthi Van Ganga Bridge" to honour his contribution to "Indian Freedom Struggle". doc no 1963826 

"Jogia Pakdi Marg" in District Siddharth Nagar, Uttar Pradesh, named after Freedom Fighter "Prabhudayal Vidyarthi" 

"Karonda Masinas Lake" and "Udaipur Lake" in District Siddharth Nagar, Uttar Pradesh, are named after Freedom Fighter Prabhudayal Vidyarthi 
"प्रधानमंत्री व मुख्यमंत्री के ड्रीम प्रोजेक्ट अमृत सरोवर का नाम स्वतंत्रता संग्राम सेनानी स्व. प्रभू दयाल विद्यार्थी के नाम पर।"

A book "Purvanchal ke Gandhi Prabhudayal Vidayarthi" by Avinash Kumar Azad, was launched in "Kapilvastu Festival", Siddharth Nagar.

A book "Gandhi ke Vidyarthi Prabhudayal" was compiled by Mrs Kamla Sahni giving an insight into life of Freedom Fighter Prabhudayal Vidyarthi 

Prabhudayal Vidyarthi is still fondly remembered as "Purvanchal ke Gandhi" by people in Eastern part of Uttar Pradesh.

References

Indian independence activists from Uttar Pradesh
Uttar Pradesh MLAs 1952–1957
Uttar Pradesh MLAs 1957–1962
Uttar Pradesh MLAs 1967–1969
Uttar Pradesh MLAs 1974–1977
People from Siddharthnagar district
1925 births
1977 deaths